James Hurren Martin Dawson (born 28 October 1937) is a New Zealand cricketer. He played in eleven first-class matches for Canterbury from 1957 and 1963.

See also
 List of Canterbury representative cricketers

References

External links
 

1937 births
Living people
New Zealand cricketers
Canterbury cricketers
Cricketers from Christchurch